A market correction is a rapid change in the nominal price of a commodity, after a barrier to free trade has been removed and the free market establishes a new equilibrium price. It may also refer to several such single-commodity corrections en masse, as a collective effect over several markets concurrently.

Stock market correction 
A stock market correction refers to a 10% pullback in the value of a stock index. Corrections end once stocks attain new highs. Stock market corrections are typically measured retrospectively from recent highs to their lowest closing price. The recovery period can be measured from the lowest closing price to new highs, to recovery. Gains of 10% from the low is an alternative definition of the exit of a correction.

Declines of 20% or more are classified as a bear market.

See also 
 Market trend
 Real estate bubble of 1796–1797
 Financial Bubble of 1837
 United States housing market correction
 United States housing bubble

References

 
Financial markets
Financial economics
Investment
Behavioral finance
Capitalism